Tia-Adana Djena Belle (born 15 June 1996) is a Barbadian athlete competing in the 400 metres hurdles. She represented her country at the 2016 Summer Olympics without advancing from the first round. In addition, she won the silver medal at the 2013 World Youth Championships.

She competed at the 2020 Summer Olympics.

Personal best

International competitions

1Disqualified in the final

References

External links
 

1996 births
Living people
Barbadian female hurdlers
World Athletics Championships athletes for Barbados
Athletes (track and field) at the 2015 Pan American Games
Athletes (track and field) at the 2019 Pan American Games
Pan American Games competitors for Barbados
Athletes (track and field) at the 2016 Summer Olympics
Olympic athletes of Barbados
Athletes (track and field) at the 2018 Commonwealth Games
Commonwealth Games competitors for Barbados
Competitors at the 2018 Central American and Caribbean Games
People from Saint George, Barbados
Athletes (track and field) at the 2020 Summer Olympics